Đường luật is the Vietnamese variant of Chinese Tang poetry. Đường also means Tang dynasty, but in Vietnam the original Chinese Tang poems are distinguished from Vietnam's own native thơ Đường luật as China's "Thơ Đường" (書唐, "Tang poetry") or "Đường thi" (唐詩, "Tang verse").

Sino-Vietnamese Đường luật poetry translated into English includes the works of poet Hồ Xuân Hương.

References

Vietnamese literary genres